Beat The Genius is an Indian quiz game show that debuted on video streaming platform Flipkart Video on 10 November 2020. The show is an original series of Flipkart Video featuring Manish Paul as a host and Parnab Mukherjee as a quizmaster. In every episode, viewers are asked five questions, and four options are given for each question, from which the correct answer must be chosen.

Show format 
It is a daily game show where home viewers are the contestants. The show features 28 episodes, each lasting for a little over 10 minutes. The host Manish Paul asks five questions in each episode and gives four options. These questions are asked to both the quizmaster and the playing audience, and 15 seconds are given for each question. Any contestant with a cumulative score more than the quizmaster is declared the winner.

Cast 
The show's cast comprises Manish Paul and Parnab Mukherjee, who is a media analyst, knowledge resource curator, performance consultant, and a theater director. As a journalist he has worked with Sportsworld, The Asian Age, and Sambad Pratidin and has written on human rights, internal displacement and the idea and notions of haves.

References

External links 
 

Hindi-language web series
2020 Indian television series debuts
Indian web series